International Society for Invertebrate Morphology (ISIM) was founded during the 1st International Congress on Invertebrate Morphology, in Copenhagen, August 2008. The objectives of the society are to promote international collaboration and provide educational opportunities and training on invertebrate morphology, and to organize and promote the international congresses of invertebrate morphology, international meetings and other forms of scientific exchange.
 The ISIM has its own Constitution

ISIM board 2014-2017
 Gerhard Scholtz (President) Institute of Biology, Humboldt-Universität zu Berlin, Germany. https://www.biologie.hu-berlin.de/de/gruppenseiten/compzool/people/gerhard_scholtz_page
 Natalia Biserova (President-Elect) Moscow State University, Moscow, Russia.
 Gonzalo Giribet (Past-President) Museum of Comparative Zoology, Harvard University, Cambridge, MA, USA.
 Julia Sigwart (Secretary)
 Katrina Worsaae (Treasurer)
 Greg Edgecombe (2nd term)
 Andreas Hejnol (2nd term)
 Sally Leys (2nd term)
 Fernando Pardos (2nd term)
 Katharina Jörger (1st term)
 Marymegan Daly (1st term)
 Georg Mayer (1st term)

ISIM board 2017-2020
 Natalia Biserova (President), Lomonosov Moscow State University, Moscow, Russian Federation http://invert.bio.msu.ru/en/staff-en/33-biserova-en .  
 Andreas Wanninger (President-elect), Department of Integrative Zoology, University of Vienna, Vienna, Austria. 
 Gerhard Scholtz (Past-president),  Department of Biology, Humboldt-Universität zu Berlin, Germany.  
 Julia Sigwart (Secretary),  School of Biological Sciences, Queen's University Belfast, UK.  
 Katrine Worsaae (Treasurer), Department of Biology, University of Copenhagen, Copenhagen, Denmark.

Advisory Council:

 Ariel Chipman (Israel)
 D. Bruce Conn (USA)
 Conrad Helm (Germany)
 Xiaoya Ma (UK)
 Pedro Martinez (Spain)
 Ana Riesgo (Spain)
 Nadezhda Rimskaya-Korsakova (Russia)
 Elected 23-08-2017, Moscow

Former meetings 
 ICIM 1 (2008) University of Copenhagen, Denmark
 ICIM 2 (2011) Harvard University, Cambridge Massachusetts, USA
 ICIM 3 (2014) Humboldt-Universität zu Berlin, Germany
 ICIM 4 (2017) Lomonosov Moscow State University, Russia

Upcoming 
 5th International Congress on Invertebrate Morphology (ICIM 5), Vienna, Austria

References

External links 
 http://www.icim4.com
 https://icim5-2020.univie.ac.at/

Biology societies
Morphology (biology)